The Blockbuster Entertainment Awards was a film awards ceremony, founded by Blockbuster Entertainment, Inc., that ran from 1995 until 2001. They were produced each year by Ken Ehrlich.

Formation and first awards
The awards were first held on June 3, 1995, at the Pantages Theatre and broadcast on June 6. The idea for the awards show came from Blockbuster marketing executive Brian Woods, who worked on the project for about two years. Blockbuster reportedly saw creating the awards as a way of promoting both the company and also the performers whose records and films were sold in their stores.

CBS signed a contract to screen the awards in late 1994, and Ken Ehrlich was hired to produce the show. Winners were determined by votes cast by customers in Blockbuster stores. The ballot consisted of the year's three top-grossing films, videos, and music albums in 33 categories. Over 1.5 million votes were cast and approximately 10 million people watched the awards on television. The music and video industry "turned out in full force" for the event, which was hosted by Cindy Crawford and William Baldwin. Celebrities attending included Bill Pullman, George Clooney, Kurt Russell, Steve Martin, Jennifer Tilly, Melanie Griffith, Danny Glover, Alfre Woodard, and David Spade. Jim Carrey, who won three awards, was one of the few winners who thanked voters for his award, stating: "I'm thankful for this award, even if you rented my tapes just to show the guy behind the counter that you rent more than porn videos." Eileen Fitzpatrick of Billboard magazine stated that the awards show was "surprisingly entertaining", and applauded Blockbuster for "raising the status of home video". Fitzpatrick questioned the idea of handing out awards for films in both theatrical and video releases, saying it did not make much sense, as almost all films nominated had been out on video for several months. This caused confusion for recipients, many of whom did not understand what award they were getting. Sandra Bullock had just received the award for Best Action / Adventure / Thriller Actress in Video for the film Speed, when she was named the winner for the same film in the theatrical category, and "literally didn't know whether she was coming on or going off the stage."

Subsequent awards
The second Blockbuster Entertainment Awards were held on March 6, 1996 at the Pantages Theatre. Kelsey Grammer hosted the awards. As Blockbuster was owned by Viacom, who also owned Paramount Pictures, MTV, Big Ticket Television and Worldvision Enterprises, producer Ken Ehrlich stated the awards "bent over backward" to avoid any connections with Paramount, in order to give the awards more credibility. Paramount productions were nominated for only 5 of the 49 nominations, though coverage of the awards switched from CBS to the United Paramount Network. Unlike the first awards, which were taped and aired later, the 2nd awards were aired live.

The 3rd Blockbuster Entertainment Awards were held on March 11, 1997 at the Pantages Theatre. Over 11 million votes were cast, which made it the largest publicly voted awards presentation in history at the time.

The 4th Annual Blockbuster Entertainment Awards were held on March 10, 1998 at the Pantages Theatre. Once again over 11 million votes were cast. Live performances at the awards included Boyz II Men, Garth Brooks, Mariah Carey and Savage Garden.

The 5th Blockbuster Entertainment Awards were held on June 16, 1999 at the Shrine Auditorium. Approximately 6.5 million people watched the awards on television. Harry Connick, Jr. described his nomination for Best Actor for the critically panned film Hope Floats as "absolutely insane".

The 6th Blockbuster Entertainment Awards were held on May 9, 2000 at the Shrine Auditorium, and for the first time presented awards for video games in addition to music and film. Christina Aguilera and the Backstreet Boys both received two awards.

The 7th and final Blockbuster Entertainment Awards were held on April 10, 2001 at the Shrine Auditorium. Approximately 4.5 million people watched the awards on television. Stevie Nicks, Sheryl Crow, Joe, Mystikal, LeAnn Rimes and Ricky Martin performed live at the event.

Cancellation
In November 2001, after having run for seven consecutive years, Blockbuster announced they were canceling the awards following concerns after the September 11 attacks, stating: "Due to the uncertainty of the times, we can't predict consumer response to our show, nor audience behavior—especially media viewing habits—all of which are being affected by world events." Blockbuster stated their decision to cancel the awards was influenced by the fact that the 53rd Primetime Emmy Awards had to be rescheduled twice following security concerns after the September 11 attacks, and that when they did air, their ratings were 22% lower than the previous year.

Ratings

References

1995 establishments in California
2001 disestablishments in California
Awards established in 1995
Awards disestablished in 2001
Impact of the September 11 attacks on television
American film awards
American television awards
Blockbuster LLC